P250 may refer to:
SIG P250, a semi-automatic pistol
Yamaha P-250, a digital piano